Alexis Bertin (born May 13, 1980) is a French professional footballer who plays for Octeville-sur-Mer.

Bertin has also played for Ligue 2 side Le Havre and English League One side Brighton & Hove Albion.

Bertin plays usually as a defensive midfielder.

Litex
Bertin made his unofficial debut for Litex in a friendly match against FK Pelister on 1 July 2008. The result of the match was a 5:1 win for Litex.

References

External links
 Alexis Bertin at Soccerbase

1980 births
Brighton & Hove Albion F.C. players
French footballers
French expatriate footballers
Le Havre AC players
AS Cannes players
FC Martigues players
Living people
First Professional Football League (Bulgaria) players
PFC Litex Lovech players
Ligue 1 players
Ligue 2 players
Expatriate footballers in England
Expatriate footballers in Bulgaria
French expatriate sportspeople in Bulgaria
Footballers from Le Havre
Association football midfielders